The Metropolitan Borough of Tameside is a metropolitan borough of Greater Manchester in England. It is named after the River Tame, which flows through the borough, and includes the towns of Ashton-under-Lyne, Audenshaw, Denton, Droylsden, Dukinfield, Hyde, Mossley and Stalybridge. Tameside is bordered by the metropolitan boroughs of Stockport and Oldham to the south and north respectively, the city of Manchester to the west and the borough of High Peak in Derbyshire to the east across Longdendale.   the overall population was 219,324. It is also the 8th-most populous borough of Greater Manchester by population.

The history of the area extends back to the Stone Age. There are over 300 listed buildings in Tameside and three Scheduled Ancient Monuments, which includes a castle of national importance. The settlements in Tameside were small townships centred on agriculture until the advent of the Industrial Revolution. The towns of the borough grew and became involved in the cotton industry, which dominated the local economy. The current borough was created in 1974 as part of the provisions of the Local Government Act 1972.

History
The history of the area stretches back up to 10,000 years; there are 22 Mesolithic sites in Tameside, the oldest dating to around 8000 BC; 21 of the 22 sites are in the hilly uplands in the north east of the borough. Evidence of Neolithic and Bronze Age activity is more limited in the borough, although the Bronze Age Stalybridge Cairn is the most complete prehistoric funerary monument in the borough. The people in the area changed from hunter-gatherers to farmers around 2500 BC–1500 BC due to climate change. Werneth Low is the most likely Iron Age farmstead site in the borough, probably dating to the late 1st millennium BC. Before the Roman conquest of Britain in the 1st century AD, the area was probably part of the territory of the Brigantes, the Celtic tribe controlling most of what is now north west England.

The area came under control of the Roman Empire in the second half of the 1st century. Roads through the area were established from Ardotalia fort in Derbyshire to Mamucium (Manchester) west of Tameside and Castleshaw Roman fort in the north. Romano-British finds in the borough include a bog body in Ashton Moss, occupation sites at Werneth Low, Harridge Pike, Roe Cross, and Mottram. A 4th-century coin hoard was found in Denton and is one of only four hoards from the 4th century in the Mersey basin. A Byzantine coin from the 6th or 7th centuries, also found in Denton, indicates continued or renewed occupation once the Romans left Britain in the early 5th century.

Nico Ditch, an earthwork stretching from Stretford to Ashton-under-Lyne, is evidence of Anglo-Saxon activity in Tameside. It was probably dug between the 7th and 9th centuries and may have been used as a boundary between the kingdoms of Mercia and Northumbria. Further evidence of Anglo-Saxon era activity in Tameside comes from the derivation of settlement names from Old English such as -tun, meaning farmstead, and leah meaning clearing.

According to the Domesday Survey of 1086, Tameside was divided into four manors, those of Tintwistle, Hollingworth, Werneth, and Mottram. The land east of the River Tame was in the Hundred of Hamestan in Cheshire and held by the Earl of Chester while to the west of the river was in the Hundred of Salford under Roger de Poitevin. These manors were divided to create further manors, so that by the 13th century most of them were owned by local families and remained in the hands of the same families until the 16th century. Manorialism continued as the main form of administration and governance until the mid-19th century.

The Industrial Revolution had a significant impact on Tameside; the area, whose main towns had previously been Ashton-under-Lyne and Mottram-in-Longdendale, was transformed from a collection of the rural, farming communities into mill towns. The towns of Ashton-under-Lyne, Dukinfield, Hyde, Mossley and Stalybridge have been described as "amongst the most famous mills towns in the North West". With only a brief interruption for the Lancashire Cotton Famine of 1861 to 1865, factories producing and processing textiles were the main industry in Tameside from the late-18th century until the mid-20th century.

In 1964, Dukinfield Borough Council convened a meeting of neighbouring local authorities with the aim of formulating a policy of cross-authority social improvement for the districts in the Tame Valley. Following deindustrialisation, the area had suffered "gross-neglect" and had large areas of housing unsuitable for human habitation. This joint enterprise comprised the nine districts that would become Tameside ten years later, plus the County Borough of Stockport. This collective agreed on creating "a linear park in the valley [of the River Tame] for the use of the townspeople and as a major recreational resource within the Manchester metropolis".

Tameside was created on 1 April 1974, by the Local Government Act 1972 as one of the ten metropolitan districts of Greater Manchester. The new district covered the territory of nine former districts which were abolished at the same time:
Ashton-under-Lyne Municipal Borough
Audenshaw Urban District
Denton Urban District
Droylsden Urban District
Dukinfield Municipal Borough
Hyde Municipal Borough
Longendale Urban District
Mossley Municipal Borough
Stalybridge Municipal Borough
Dukinfield, Hyde, Longendale and Stalybridge had been in the administrative county of Cheshire prior to the 1974 reforms, whilst the other five districts had been in the administrative county of Lancashire.

A name for the metropolitan borough proved problematic. The Redcliffe-Maud Report had used the name Ashton-Hyde, but double-barrelled names were prohibited for the new districts. Had Ashton-under-Lyne been a county borough, or had had a less common name, "it might have been chosen as the new name" for the new district. The eight other towns objected, adamant that "a new name should be found". Thirty suggestions were put forward, including Brigantia, Clarendon, Hartshead, Kayborough, Tame, Ninetowns, and West Pennine, with Hartshead (with reference to Hartshead Pike) being the most popular throughout most of the consultation period. However, the name Tameside (with reference to the River Tame, but a  concocted name with no historical basis) won 15 votes to Hartshead's 10 in a final stage of voting. The new district was awarded borough status from its creation, allowing the chairman of the council to take the title of mayor. In 1986 Tameside effectively became a unitary authority with the abolition of the Greater Manchester County Council.

Geography

 Tameside borders High Peak in Derbyshire to the east, the Metropolitan Borough of Oldham to the north, the Metropolitan Borough of Stockport to the south, and the City of Manchester to the west. Tameside features flat lowlands in the west and highlands in the east where the western edge of the Pennines encroaches on the borough. The hills in the east include Hartshead Pike and Werneth Low which is also a country park. As well as coal measures running north–south through the centre of the borough, there are areas of peat in the north east and there are large areas of boulder clay all over Tameside.

Waterways in Tameside include the rivers Medlock and Etherow, which form parts of Tameside's western and eastern boundaries respectively, and the River Tame crosses the borough north to south, giving Tameside its name. The Ashton Canal, the Hollinwood Branch Canal, the Huddersfield Narrow Canal, and the Peak Forest Canal all run through the borough. There are also several reservoirs, including the Audenshaw Reservoirs. Greenspace accounts for 63.5% of the Tameside's total area, domestic buildings and gardens comprise 17.4%, and the rest is made up of roads and non-domestic buildings.

Localities within the boundaries of Tameside include: Ashton-under-Lyne, Audenshaw, Broadbottom, Carrbrook, Copley, Denton, Droylsden, Dukinfield, Flowery Field, Gee Cross, Godley, Godley Green, Guide Bridge, Hartshead Green, Hattersley, Haughton Green, Hazelhurst, Heyrod, Hollingworth, Hyde, Landslow Green, Luzley, Millbrook, Mossley, Mottram in Longdendale, Newton, Park Bridge, Roe Cross, Stalybridge, Warhill, and Woolley Bridge.

Governance

Parliamentary constituencies
The residents of the Tameside are represented in the United Kingdom Parliament by Members of Parliament (MPs) for three constituencies. Ashton-under-Lyne, which also includes parts of the Metropolitan Borough of Oldham, is represented by Angela Rayner (Labour). Denton and Reddish, which also covers parts of the Metropolitan Borough of Stockport, is represented by Andrew Gwynne (Labour). Stalybridge and Hyde, which is entirely within Tameside, is represented by Jonathan Reynolds (Labour).

Council

In 2007, Tameside Metropolitan Borough Council was assessed by the Audit Commission and judged to be "improving strongly" in providing services for local people. Overall the council was awarded "four star" status meaning it was "performing strongly" and "well above minimum requirements", putting it in the top 38% of all local authorities.

Civil parishes form the bottom tier of local government; the parish councils are involved in planning, management of town and parish centres, and promoting tourism. Mossley is the only civil parish in Tameside. In 2001 9,856 people lived there, 4.6% of the borough's population.

Before becoming a civil parish, Mossley was a municipal borough. The unparished areas are: Ashton-under-Lyne (municipal borough), Audenshaw (urban district), Denton (urban district), Droylsden (urban district), Dukinfield (municipal borough), Hyde (municipal borough), Longdendale (urban district), and Stalybridge (municipal borough). The status of each area before 1974 is shown in brackets. An urban district was a type of local government district which covered an urbanised area. Ashton-under-Lyne, Audenshaw, Denton, Droylsden, and Mossley were previously in Lancashire. Dukinfield, Hyde, Longdendale, and Stalybridge were in Cheshire.

Demography

Ethnicity 

At the 2011 UK census, the Metropolitan Borough of Tameside had a total population of 219,324. Of the 94,953 households in Tameside, 30.8% were married couples living together, 32.7% were one-person households, 11.5% were co-habiting couples and 12.8% were lone parents.

Of those aged 16 and over in Tameside, 28.1% had no academic qualifications, significantly higher than 22.5% in all of England. 7% of Tameside's residents were born outside the United Kingdom, significantly lower than the national average of 13.8%. The largest minority group was Asian, at 6.6% of the population.

In 1841, 8.5% of Tameside's population was middle class compared to 14% in England and Wales; this increased to 13.1% in 1931 (15% nationally) and 37.0% in 2001 (48% nationally). From 1841 to 1991, the working class population of Tameside and across the country was in decline, falling steadily from 58.0% (36% nationally) to 22.8% in 1991 (21% nationally). It has since increased slightly, up to 32.9% (26% nationwide). The rest of the population was made up of clerical workers and skilled manual workers.

Population change
Although Tameside has only existed as a Metropolitan Borough since 1974, the table below details the population change – including the percentage change since the last census 10 years earlier – in the area since 1801 using figures from the towns, villages, and civil parishes that would later become constituent parts of Tameside.

Religion

The following table shows the religious identity of residents residing in Tameside according to the 2011 and the 2021 census results.

Tameside is covered by the Roman Catholic dioceses of Shrewsbury and Salford, and the Church of England dioceses of Manchester and Chester.

There are two Grade I listed churches in Tameside, St Anne's Church, in Haughton, was built in 1881 in the Gothic Revival style by J Medland Taylor. St Michael and All Angels' Church in Ashton-under-Lyne is a 15th-century parish church which was virtually rebuilt in the 19th century. A church on the site dates back to at least 1262. St Lawrence's Church, in Denton, is a Grade II* listed building and a timber-framed church. It was remodelled by J Medland Taylor in 1872.

Economy

Tameside is currently undergoing redevelopment through the Vision Tameside project which should be completed by 2018.

Vision Tameside – a partnership between Tameside council and Tameside College – is a redevelopment strategy.

Three "advanced learning centres" are being built in central Ashton town and at the college's Beaufort Road home.

Phase one comprises two sites. The new Clarendon Sixth Form College, which began taking students in the autumn of 2015, was officially opened by Coronation Street actress Brooke Vincent on 9 March 2016. The college theatre was named in Brooke's honour.

An "advanced technologies centre" is being built on Stamford Street, Ashton. When it opens in 2017 it will provide a learning facility to support the growth of advanced engineering and technology in Tameside.

Phase two of VisionTameside will create an advanced skills centre for Tameside College alongside a new joint service centre for Tameside Council and partners. The skills centre will provide facilities for students studying a wide range of vocational subjects including hair and beauty, hospitality and catering, bakery and confectionery, travel and tourism and business skills.

Ashton's Victorian town hall and the old water board offices, which are both listed buildings, are being retained. Work should be completed in early 2018.

Phase three will ensure the Beaufort Road campus offers learners modern, inspirational learning spaces. Alongside the new advanced technologies centre, they will have access to facilities for engineering, construction and the built environment, motor-vehicle, sport and public services and health and social care provision

Provision for students with severe learning difficulties and/or disabilities will continue to be based at the Beaufort Road where a new sports academy was opened in February, 2015, by former Manchester United and England footballer Paul Scholes.

In addition, Ashton's old public baths, which lay derelict for many years, has been reborn as a "high-tech business incubator" with help from the European Regional Development Fund and the Heritage Lottery Fund.

Work at the mid-Victorian building, which closed as a swimming baths in 1975, has involved cleaning, repairs and the replacement of external stonework. The new office space is housed inside a free-standing timber-clad pod within the former main pool.

At the same time, Ashton's market has been refurbished with the installation of kiosks alongside traditional stalls.

The Ashton Arcades shopping centre opened in 1995. In 2006, after failing twice to gain permission to develop a site in the neighbouring borough of Stockport, IKEA announced plans to build its first town centre-store in Ashton-under-Lyne. The store is expected to create 500 new jobs as well as attract other businesses to the area. The store opened on 19 October 2006 and covers  At the time of its creation, the store was the tallest in Britain.

Life science industries have been identified as growth industries in Greater Manchester and are concentrated in Oldham and Tameside.

Average house prices in Tameside are the 5th lowest of the ten boroughs in Greater Manchester and are prices just 60% of the average price for the England.

At the 2011 UK census, Tameside had 161,459 residents aged 16 to 74. 4.3% of these people were students, 4.0% looking after home or family, 6.2% long-term sick or disabled and 2.2% economically inactive for other reasons.

In 2011, of 101,892 residents of Tameside in employment, the industry of employment was 17.7% retail and wholesale, 13.2% manufacturing, 12.4% health and social work, 8.5% construction, 8.3% education, 5.8% public administration and defence, 5.3% transport, 5.0% professional, scientific and technical, 4.8% administrative, 4.5% hotels and restaurants, 4.1% financial, 2.4% information and communication, 1.7% real estate, 1.6% energy and water supply, and 4.5% others.

Landmarks

In February 2001, Tameside had one Grade I listed buildings, 19 Grade II*, and 289 Grade II. The number of Grade I listed buildings in Tameside has increased to two, these are St Anne's Church in Haughton; St Michael and All Angels' Church in Ashton-under-Lyne. (Fairbottom Farm Barn, a 17th-century farm building, is listed on the council's website as grade I but is listed by English Heritage as grade II.) In Tameside are three of Greater Manchester's Sites of Special Scientific Interest, Boar Flat, part of Dark Peak, the Hollinwood Branch Canal and the Huddersfield Narrow Canal.

There are three Scheduled Ancient Monuments in the borough, a Bronze Age cairn in Stalybridge, Buckton Castle, and Nico Ditch. Buckton Castle is a 12th-century enclosure castle near Carrbrook and was probably built by one of the earls of Chester. The castle lay ruinous by 1360, and has been described as "one of England's most important castles". Nico Ditch is an earthwork running from Ashton-under-Lyne in the east to Stretford in the west, in the borough of Trafford.

Tameside has nine conservation areas: Ashton and Stalybridge town centres; Carrbrook, Copley St. Paul's, and Millbrook in Stalybridge; Fairfield in Droylsden; Mottram-in-Longdendale; Portland Basin; and St. Anne's in Haughton.

The Museum of the Manchester Regiment is housed in Ashton-under-Lyne's town hall. The museum displays relics related to the Manchester Regiment including five Victoria Crosses awarded to members of the regiment. Park Bridge Heritage Centre in the Medlock Valley is a museum dedicated to the history of the settlement of Park Bridge and its industry. Broad Mills Heritage Site, in Broadbottom, preserves the remains of an early 19th-century textile works. Art galleries in the borough include Astley Cheetham Art Gallery in Stalybridge and Central Art Gallery in Ashton-under-Lyne.

Tameside has eight designated Local Nature Reserves which are Knott Hill, Hollinwood Branch Canal, Great Wood, Haughton Dale, Hulmes and Hardy Woods, Castle Clough and Cowbury Dale, Hurst Clough and Rocher Vale. Four more are to be designated.

Education

Since 2007 Tameside's schools have been transformed as the result of multimillion-pound investment.

Virtually every high school has been replaced or remodelled. Eighteen primary schools have been rebuilt in recent years and another 20 have undergone major remodelling. In addition, the borough has opened the first entirely new schools in its history:  Inspire Academy on Mossley Road, Ashton, and Discovery Academy off Porlock Avenue, Hattersley. Both offer 420 places plus a nursery.

In 2015, GCSE results improved more in Tameside than anywhere else in the North West, and the borough was one of the top 10 nationally for the most improved results.

At Key Stage 4 57.3% of pupils in the borough achieved five or more A* to C grades including English and maths – a 3.6% improvement on the previous year.

In terms of expected progress in English, 73% of pupils make expected progress in Tameside compared to 71% nationally. In maths 66% of pupils make expected progress, in line with the national average of 67%.

At Key Stage 2, 80% of pupils in Tameside achieved level 4+ in reading, writing and maths combined, sustaining the borough's 6% improvement in results from 2013 to 2014.

Transport

Railway

The borough is served by 13 railway stations:
Fairfield, Guide Bridge, Hyde Central and Hyde North are all on the Hope Valley Line between Sheffield and Manchester.
Broadbottom, Flowery Field, Godley, Guide Bridge, Hattersley and Newton for Hyde are served by the Glossop Line between Glossop, Hadfield and Manchester.
Ashton, Mossley and Stalybridge are on the Huddersfield Line.
Denton is on the Stockport to Stalybridge Line.

Tram
Work on an extension of the Manchester Metrolink costing £260 million began in 2008. Trams began to run to Droylsden in February 2013 and finally to Ashton in September 2013.

Buses
Ashton bus station was converted into a new transport interchange. A covered concourse replaced the five island platforms and the site was linked to the Metrolink terminus. It has new waiting areas, bicycle parking and better access to travel information and tickets. Improved pedestrian routes can now take people into the town centre. It was completed in October 2020.

The new Hyde bus station opened on 23 August 2007, having cost £3.7 million to build.

Footpaths
Tameside Council is responsible for maintaining the public rights of way in the borough, including  of footpaths.

Twin towns
The Metropolitan Borough of Tameside has formal twinning links with places in China, France and Germany.(The arrangement with Mutare, Zimbabwe has been suspended due to the political unrest in that country.)

Some localities were originally twinned with a place within the Metropolitan Borough prior to its creation in 1974. In the list below the brackets show where the place was twinned with before 1974 and since when.

  Armentières, France, (Municipal Borough of Stalybridge, 1955)
  Bengbu, China, (Tameside 1995)
  Colmar, France, (Municipal Borough of Hyde, 1963)
  Champagnole, France (Municipal Borough of Dukinfield, 1958)
  Chaumont, France, (Municipal Borough of Ashton-under-Lyne, 1956)
  Hem, France, (Municipal Borough of Mossley, 1972)
  Kierspe, Germany (Denton Town Twinning Association, 1992 and 2012)
  Montigny-le-Bretonneux, France, (Denton Town Twinning Association, 1992 and 2012)
  Ruppichteroth, Germany, (Longdendale Urban District, 1974)
  Villemomble, France, (Droylsden Town Twinning Association, 1983)

Sport

Tameside is home to a number of non-league football teams and a variety of other sports clubs.

The Borough have several football teams playing across several levels of the National League System of Football, commonly known as Non League Football, of which several have played as high as the National League Tier 5.

National League North (Tier 6)
Curzon Ashton
Northern Premier League 
(Tier 7)
Hyde United
Stalybridge Celtic
Ashton United
(Tier 8)
Mossley

Only Stalybridge Celtic have played in the Football League, where they were members between 1919 and 1922.

Outside the NLS System, Dukinfield Town (Manchester League Premier Division , Tier 11) and Denton Town (Cheshire League Second Division, Tier 12)

Droylsden are currently inactive following the events of COVID-19 however have played host to Stretford Paddock from their expansion from Sunday League to the NLS System, and currently play in the Cheshire League Second Division.

Tameside has been home to three players who have been members of winning World Cup squads. 
Sir Geoff Hurst and James Arnfield were members of the 1966 World Cup winning England side, whilst Simone Perrotta won the World Cup in 2006 with Italy, though he was born in Ashton. All three have been given a statue outside Curzon Ashton's Tameside Stadium. 

The Region hosts 2 Rugby Union sides, with Aldwynians the highest ranked side, Currently playing in the ADM Lancashire and Cheshire 1st Division while Ashton Under Lyne RFC play in the 11th Tier. Eric Evans, who was Aldwynians Captain represented England between 1956-58.

Though the Borough does not have a Professional Rugby League side, Oldham Rugby League have played at several Grounds across Tameside. In 2003 they played several Challenge Cup and League games at Ashton United's Hurst Cross ground, whilst in more modern times when playing Super League sides or when in the Championship Division have played at Stalybridge Celtic's Bower Fold as their regular home isn't suitable for higher division games.

Cricket is heavily represented in the area with all areas hosting several sides with the Greater Manchester Cricket League, Denton having the most within the higher tiers of the League System (Denton St Lawrence and Denton West Cricket Club both playing in the Premier Division), Mottram being represented in the Top Division by Roe Cross and Mottram CC in the third level of the League, Hyde are represented with Flowery Field CC in the 2nd tier and Dukinfield CC in the Tier 3 Championship Division.

Tameside Netball Club play in the Highest Amateur Division of the sport (formally the Top Division before the introduction of the Professional Super League)

See also

 Healthcare in Greater Manchester
 2007 Tameside Council election
 Tameside local elections

References

Bibliography

External links

Tameside Council

Video clips
 Tameside MBC YouTube channel

 
Districts of England established in 1974
Metropolitan boroughs of Greater Manchester